Amos Frimpong is an association footballer who plays right back for Asante Kotoko in the Ghana Premier League. He is currently the captain of the team.
Amos was bought to fill in for the departing of Yaw Frimpong to TP Mazembe.

References

External links
 

Living people
Ghanaian footballers
Association football defenders
Ghana Premier League players
Place of birth missing (living people)
Nationality missing
Ghana international footballers
1991 births
BA Stars F.C. players